The Junior ABA League, officially known as the U19 ABA League Championship, is a regional boy's youth age basketball tournament that is contested between the youth selections of basketball clubs from the ABA League. It is run by the ABA League JTD. It is a regional competition between men's teams from six countries: Bosnia and Herzegovina, Croatia, Montenegro, North Macedonia, Serbia and Slovenia.

History 
The ABA League Assembly, held on July 24, 2017 in Belgrade, Serbia, decided to organize the Junior League with a desire to strengthen its position as the main power for development of basketball in the region. On October 26, 2017, participants, hosts and dates for the inaugural tournament was confirmed.

Mega Bemax became champions of the first-ever U19 ABA League Championship Final Four tournament, which took place in Laktaši in 2018, as they have beaten Crvena zvezda. In 2019, the second Final Four tournament took place in Slavonski Brod, where Cibona became champion beating Crvena zvezda in the final.

On 12 March 2020, the ABA League Assembly temporarily suspended the 2019–20 season due to the COVID-19 pandemic. On 27 May 2020, the ABA League Assembly canceled indefinitely the season due to the COVID-19 pandemic.

Finals

Records and statistics

By club

By country

Awards 
 Ideal Starting Five
 Most Valuable Player

See also
 Euroleague Basketball Next Generation Tournament
 VTB United Youth League

References

External links
 Junior Adriatic League
 Adriatic League page at Eurobasket.com

U19 ABA League Championship
2017 establishments in Europe
Sports leagues established in 2017
ABA